Peter G. Camden (May 23, 1801 in  – July 23, 1873) was the ninth mayor of St. Louis, Missouri serving from 1846 to 1847. He was a member of the American Party.

Biography
Peter G. Camden was born in Amherst County, Virginia on May 23, 1801.

He died in Jennings, Missouri on July 23, 1873, and was buried at Bellefontaine Cemetery.

References

External links

1801 births
1873 deaths
People from Amherst County, Virginia
Missouri Know Nothings
Washington and Lee University alumni
Kentucky lawyers
Businesspeople from Missouri
Mayors of St. Louis
Burials at Bellefontaine Cemetery